The Yakovlev Yak-38 (NATO reporting name: "Forger") was Soviet Naval Aviation's only operational VTOL strike fighter aircraft in addition to being its first operational carrier-based fixed-wing aircraft. It was developed specifically for, and served almost exclusively on, the s (heavy aviation cruiser in Russian classification).

Design and development

Designed by the A.S. Yakovlev Design Bureau JSC, the first drawings showed a supersonic aircraft strongly resembling the Hawker P.1154 in study in the United Kingdom, but with two R27-300 engines. Supersonic performance would have implied many difficulties of development, and it was decided to initially develop a relatively simple aircraft limited to Mach 0.95. Although the Yak-38 and Yak-38M were developed from the land-based Yakovlev Yak-36, the aircraft had almost nothing in common.

The prototype VM-01 was finished on 14 April 1970. Though outwardly similar to the British Hawker Siddeley Harrier, it followed a completely different configuration. Together with a vectorable thrust engine in the rear used during flight, two smaller, and less powerful, engines were housed in the front portion of the fuselage and used purely for takeoff and landing.

The Yak-38 possessed an automatic ejection seat. If one of the takeoff engines failed or the aircraft rolled past 60 degrees the pilot was automatically ejected from the aircraft.

Operational history

The majority of Yak-36M initial production deliveries were to the 279 OKShAP (Otdelny Korabelny Shturmovoy Aviatsionny Polk, Independent Shipboard Attack Air Regiment), initially based at Saki, the AV-MF's training centre in Crimea.

In July 1979, Minsk arrived in the Sea of Japan, where the vessel was home-ported at Strelok Bay, the Yak-38 component of its air wing thereafter being provided by the 311 OKShAP subordinate to the Pacific Fleet.

In September 1982,  – the third Kiev-class carrier – was commissioned. By now the V/STOL technique had been well practised, and the resulting increase in the Yak-38's overall performance and capability was exploited during the passage of Novorossiysk from Severomorsk to join the Pacific Fleet. A pair of armed Yak-38s operating from Minsk intercepted aircraft from the U.S. carrier  over the Arabian Sea on 16 December 1982. This event marked the first time Soviet VTOL aircraft intercepted American aircraft while armed with missiles.

In a maritime context, the Yak-38 was not limited to the decks of Kiev. In September 1983, AV-MF pilots operated from the civilian Ro-Ro vessel , and NII-VVS pilots conducted further tests from another Ro-Ro vessel, Nikolai Cherkasov. In both cases, use was made of a heat-resistant landing platform; further land-based trials tested the practicality of dispersed landing platforms, in a similar concept to the British Royal Air Force's Harrier operations in West Germany.

Variants

Yak-36M "Forger"
The initial pre-production version, differing slightly from the Yak-38. It weighed only  compared to the Yak-38's  and the engines were slightly less powerful.

Yak-38 "Forger-A"
The Yak-38 was the first production model, it first flew on 15 January 1971, and entered service with the Soviet Naval Aviation on 11 August 1976. A total of 143 Yak-38s were produced.

Yak-38M "Forger-A"
The Yak-38M was an upgraded version of the Yak-38, the main difference being the new Tumansky R-28V-300 and Rybinsk RD-38 engines. The air intakes were slightly widened and the underwing pylons reinforced to carry a  weapons load. The Yak-38M entered service with the Soviet Naval Aviation after June 1985, a total of 50 Yak-38M being produced.

Yak-38U "Forger-B"
Two-seat training version of the Soviet Naval Aviation. This version differed from the basic aircraft in having an enlarged fuselage to accommodate a two-seat cockpit. The Yak-38U entered service on 15 November 1978, a total of 38 Yak-38U being produced, with the 38th aircraft being delivered in 1981.

Unbuilt projects
Yak-39
Multi-role VTOL fighter/attack aircraft project dating from 1983, employing one R-28V-300 and two RD-48 engines, PRNK-39 avionics suite; S-41D multi-mode radar, larger wing, increased fuel capacity and expanded weapons options based around Shkval or Kaira PGM designation systems.

Operators

 Soviet Navy
 Soviet Naval Aviation

Specifications (Yakovlev Yak-38M)

See also

References

Notes

Citations

Bibliography

 Wilson, Stewart. Combat Aircraft since 1945. Fyshwick, Australia: Aerospace Publications, 2000. .
 "Yak-36 Forger—interim V/Stol." Flight International, 2 May 1981.

External links

 Yak-38 photo gallery
 Yak-38 Information
 Walkaround on 2 Yak-38 in Monino Aviation Museum, Russia

Carrier-based aircraft
1970s Soviet fighter aircraft
V/STOL aircraft by thrust vectoring
Lift jet
Yak-038
Trijets
Aircraft first flown in 1971